Louis E. LaPierre (born 1942) is a Canadian former professor of ecology.  From 1970 until his retirement in 2001, he taught at the Université de Moncton, where he held the K. C. Irving Chair in Sustainable Development from 1993 to  2001. In 2003, he was awarded professor emeritus status by the Université de Moncton. In September 2013, he resigned as professor emeritus at University of Moncton.

LaPierre served on many environmental review panels, held major positions at many Canadian environmental organizations, and developed strategies for protecting natural areas throughout New Brunswick. He served as an environmental advisor to J. D. Irving, and promoted a "scientific approach" to resolving New Brunswick's hydraulic fracturing controversy, rejecting calls for a moratorium and promoting increased shale gas exploration. In 2013, he was appointed Chair of the newly created New Brunswick Energy Institute, which was tasked with researching hydraulic fracturing in the province.

Although he published very few peer-reviewed academic papers, LaPierre received numerous awards and accolades throughout his career, including a Lifetime Achievement Award and an Eco-citizenship Award from Environment Canada, and a 125th Anniversary of the Confederation of Canada Medal. In 2001, he received an honorary doctorate from Université Sainte-Anne. In 2012, he was made a member of the Order of Canada.

On September 4, 2013, Radio-Canada reported that LaPierre had been misrepresenting his academic credentials. Specifically, LaPierre falsely claimed that he had an M.Sc. and a Ph.D. in Ecology from the University of Maine, whereas he had actually received a master's degree in Science Education from the University of Maine and a Ph.D. in Education from Walden University. Shortly thereafter, LaPierre apologized and resigned from his academic and non-academic appointments and was stripped of his professor emeritus status. LaPierre explained the situation by saying his degree was in conjunction with the University of Maine and Walden in 1985, though neither university confirmed such an agreement.

As a result of his falsehoods, many of LaPierre's recommendations to government and research premises were called into question. One environmental researcher said that his work for the Institute for Environmental Monitoring and Research focused on political motivations rather than environmental ones.

In May 16, 2014, LaPierre resigned from the Order of Canada, becoming one of only six other people to have ever been removed from the Order.

References

External links 
 

1942 births
Living people
Canadian ecologists
Academic staff of the Université de Moncton
University of Maine alumni
Walden University (Minnesota) alumni
Academics from New Brunswick
People from Moncton
Place of birth missing (living people)